This is a list of German football transfers in the winter transfer window 2018–19 by club. Only transfers of the Bundesliga and 2. Bundesliga are included.

Bundesliga

Note: Flags indicate national team as has been defined under FIFA eligibility rules. Players may hold more than one non-FIFA nationality.

FC Bayern Munich

In:

Out:

FC Schalke 04

In:

Out:

1899 Hoffenheim

In:

Out:

Borussia Dortmund

In:

Out:

Bayer 04 Leverkusen

In:

Out:

RB Leipzig

In:

Out:

VfB Stuttgart

In:

Out:

Eintracht Frankfurt

In:

Out:

Borussia Mönchengladbach

In:

Out:

Hertha BSC

In:

Out:

Werder Bremen

In:

Out:

FC Augsburg

In:

Out:

Hannover 96

In:

Out:

1. FSV Mainz 05

In:

Out:

SC Freiburg

In:

Out:

VfL Wolfsburg

In:

Out:

Fortuna Düsseldorf

In:

Out:

1. FC Nürnberg

In:

Out:

2. Bundesliga

Hamburger SV

In:

Out:

1. FC Köln

In:

Out:

Holstein Kiel

In:

Out:

Arminia Bielefeld

In:

Out:

Jahn Regensburg

In:

Out:

VfL Bochum

In:

Out:

MSV Duisburg

In:

Out:

1. FC Union Berlin

In:

Out:

FC Ingolstadt 04

In:

Out:

SV Darmstadt 98

In:

Out:

SV Sandhausen

In:

Out:

FC St. Pauli

In:

Out:

1. FC Heidenheim

In:

Out:

Dynamo Dresden

In:

Out:

Greuther Fürth

In:

Out:

Erzgebirge Aue

In:

Out:

1. FC Magdeburg

In:

Out:

SC Paderborn 07

In:

Out:

See also
 2018–19 Bundesliga
 2018–19 2. Bundesliga

References

External links
 Official site of the DFB 
 Kicker.de 
 Official site of the Bundesliga 
 Official site of the Bundesliga

Football transfers winter 2018–19
Trans
2018